Misaki Doi and Xu Yifan were the defending champions of 2013, the tournament was not held in 2014. Doi chose not to participate. Xu partnered Wang Yafan, but lost in the quarterfinals to Yang Zhaoxuan and Zhang Yuxuan.

Japanese-duo Shuko Aoyama and Eri Hozumi won the title, defeating Chan Chin-wei and Zhang Kailin in the final, 7–5, 6–7(7–9), [10–7].

Seeds

Draw

Draw

References
Main Draw

Nanjing Ladies Open - Doubles
2015 Singles